The 2015 Shanghai Greenland Shenhua season was Shanghai Greenland Shenhua's 12th season in the Chinese Super League and 53rd overall in the Chinese top flight. They also competed in the Chinese FA Cup, reaching the final but ultimately losing to Jiangsu Sainty.

Squad
Updated 5 March 2015

Reserve squad

On loan

Transfers

Winter

In:

Out:

Summer

In:

Out:

Competitions

Chinese Super League

Results summary

Results

Table

Chinese FA Cup

Final

Squad statistics

Appearances and goals

|-
|colspan="14"|Players who away from the club on loan:

|-
|colspan="14"|Players who appeared for Shanghai Greenland Shenhua who left during the season:

|}

Goal scorers

Disciplinary Record

References

Shanghai Shenhua F.C. seasons
Shanghai Greenland Shenhua F.C.